Surly Squirrel is a fictional character created by Peter Lepeniotis and the main protagonist of The Nut Job franchise. He first appeared in the 2005 computer animated short film Surly Squirrel and the 2011 short film Nuts and Robbers. He then appeared in the 2014 computer animated movie The Nut Job, and its 2017 sequel, The Nut Job 2: Nutty by Nature.  He is voiced by Will Arnett in those two films and he will return in an upcoming spin-off animated series.

Reception

A reviewer for the Washington Post described Surly as a "selfish scurrier" with a "grouchy attitude and a "mind for schemes", concluding that "He's not a very fun character to travel with". In 2014, a reviewer in IGN described the character as "admittedly quite surly", but also "trapped in a bizarre and contradictory social commentary about the importance of sharing and the dangers of socialism."
 A reviewer for the New York Times described the character as a "dour squirrel" prone to tantrums.

See also 
 The Nut Job
 The Nut Job 2: Nutty by Nature

References

The Nut Job
Anthropomorphic squirrels
Film characters introduced in 2005
Fictional gentleman thieves
Fictional con artists
Fictional tricksters